Catuna niji, or Fox's pathfinder, is a butterfly in the family Nymphalidae. It is found in Sierra Leone, Liberia, Ivory Coast, western Ghana, western Cameroon, Gabon and the Democratic Republic of the Congo (the Mayoumbe region). The habitat consists of forests.

The larvae feed on Manilkara, Englerophytum, Vincentella and Afrosersalisia species.

References

Butterflies described in 1965
Limenitidinae